is a former Japanese football player.

Club career
Fukuo was born in Nishinomiya on May 6, 1984. He joined Cerezo Osaka from youth team in 2003. However he did not play in the match. He moved to Regional Leagues club Rosso Kumamoto (later Roasso Kumamoto) in 2005. He played as center back in many matches. The club also was promoted to Japan Football League in 2006 and J2 League in 2008. Although he played as regular player until 2010, his opportunity to play decreased from 2011. He moved to J3 League club Gainare Tottori in 2014 and Fujieda MYFC in 2015. He retired end of 2017 season.

National team career
In September 2001, he was selected Japan U-17 national team for 2001 U-17 World Championship. He played full time in all 3 matches.

Club statistics

References

External links

1984 births
Living people
Association football people from Hyōgo Prefecture
Japanese footballers
Japan youth international footballers
J1 League players
J2 League players
J3 League players
Japan Football League players
Cerezo Osaka players
Roasso Kumamoto players
Gainare Tottori players
Fujieda MYFC players
Association football defenders